The State Treasurer is the state of Arizona’s chief banker and investment officer. The Treasurer’s Office accounts for and manages the cash flows of state government, directs the state’s banking services, disburses public funds, and manages Arizona’s investment portfolio. The state treasurer also serves on the management boards of a number of public entities. The state treasurer is one of six statewide elected officials and serves a term of four years. A person may only serve as state treasurer for two consecutive terms. The Treasurer is third (behind the Secretary of State and Attorney General, respectively) in the line of succession to the office of Governor of Arizona.

List of State Treasurers of Arizona

References

External links
 State Treasurer of Arizona official website

 
Government of Arizona